Kütahya Air Base  is a military airport of the Turkish Air Force located in Kütahya, Turkey. The airport operates as primarily as a military air base but also accepts civilian passenger flights.

Facilities

References

External links

Airports in Turkey
Buildings and structures in Kütahya Province
Turkish Air Force bases